Desiree Vranken (born 28 June 1997) is a Dutch wheelchair racer who competes in T34 classification sprint events. Her most notable athletics achievement came at the 2012 Summer Paralympics in London where she finished in third place to claim the bronze medal in the 200 metre sprint. Vranken has also represented her country at World and European Championships, recording four fourth places to keep her just outside the medal places.

References 

Medalists at the 2012 Summer Paralympics
Athletes (track and field) at the 2012 Summer Paralympics
Dutch female wheelchair racers
People from Roermond
1985 births
Dutch female sprinters
Living people
Paralympic bronze medalists for the Netherlands
Paralympic medalists in athletics (track and field)
Paralympic athletes of the Netherlands
20th-century Dutch women
21st-century Dutch women
Sportspeople from Limburg (Netherlands)